"Life #9" is a song written by Kostas and Tony Perez, and recorded by American country music artist Martina McBride.  It was released in January 1994 as the second single from her album The Way That I Am.  The song was her fifth single release overall, and peaked at number 6 on the U.S. Billboard Hot Country Singles & Tracks chart and at number 8 on the RPM Country Tracks chart in Canada.

Content
McBride considered the song "not the kind of song, melody, attitude of whatever that I was really comfortable singing", and producer Paul Worley thought that it was "not one of [his] favorites" due to it sounding like a disco song.

Music video
A music video was released for the song, directed by Steven Goldmann.

Personnel
The following musicians perform on this track:
Joe Chemay – bass guitar
Larry Franklin – fiddle
Paul Franklin – pedal steel guitar
Bill Hullett – acoustic guitar
Anthony S. Martin – backing vocals
Brent Mason – electric guitar
Martina McBride – lead and backing vocals
Steve Nathan – keyboards
John Wesley Ryles – backing vocals
Dennis Wilson – backing vocals
Lonnie Wilson – drums
Paul Worley – acoustic guitar

Chart performance

Year-end charts

References

1994 singles
1994 songs
Martina McBride songs
Songs written by Kostas (songwriter)
Song recordings produced by Paul Worley
RCA Records singles
Music videos directed by Steven Goldmann